Vadim Malakhatko (born 22 March 1977) is a Ukrainian (until 2007) and Belgian (since 2007) chess grandmaster. He was a member of the gold medal-winning Ukrainian team at the 2001 World Team Chess Championship. In 2000, he won with the Ukrainian team a bronze medal in the 34th Chess Olympiad in Istanbul.

Chess career

1999 – came second at Alushta tournament
2004 – tied for first with Petar Genov in the 3rd Condom Chess Open
2006 – won Politiken Cup in Copenhagen
2007 – tied for 2nd–4th with Loek van Wely and Alexei Fedorov in the President's Cup in Baku
2007 – tied for 2nd–7th with Kiril Georgiev, Dimitrios Mastrovasilis, Mircea Pârligras, Hristos Banikas and Dmitry Svetushkin in the Acropolis International Chess Tournament
2007/08 – tied for first with Nidjat Mamedov and Valeriy Neverov in the Hastings International Chess Congress
2009 – came in first at the Arcapita Open in Bahrain
2009 – tied for 2nd–3rd with Edvīns Ķeņģis at the Al Saleh 8th International Open in Yemen
2009 – tied for 3rd–8th with Anton Filippov, Elshan Moradiabadi, Merab Gagunashvili, Alexander Shabalov and Niaz Murshed in the Ravana Challenge Tournament in Colombo
2010 – tied for 1st–3rd with Tigran Gharamian and Deep Sengupta at the 24th Open Pierre and Vacances
2011 – won the 8th edition of the Balagna Open in Corsica
2019 – tied for 2nd–3rd with Liu Zhaoqi at the 2nd Ferreira do Alentejo Open

On the May 2011 FIDE Elo rating list, Malakhatko has a rating of 2546. His handle on the Internet Chess Club is "Vadim77".

Personal life

He is married to WGM Anna Zozulia.

Notable games
 Vadim Malakhatko vs Bogdan Lalic, 83rd Hastings Chess Congress 2008, Queen's Gambit Accepted: Gunsberg Defense, Prianishenmo Gambit (D24), 1–0
 Vadim Malakhatko vs Jonathan Speelman, Isle of Man 2007, Queen's Indian Defense: Kasparov-Petrosian Variation, Petrosian Attack (E12), 1–0
 Vadim Malakhatko vs John K Shaw, Cappelle la Grande 2007, Slav Defense: General (D10), 1–0

References

External links

Vadim Malakhatko at 365Chess.com

1977 births
Living people
Sportspeople from Kyiv
Chess grandmasters
Chess Olympiad competitors
Ukrainian chess players
Belgian chess players
Ukrainian emigrants to Belgium
Naturalised citizens of Belgium